Matteo Silva (born 17 October 1960, in Ulm, Germany) is an Italian-German-Swiss author, music producer, ethnomusicologist and visual artist.
He was born in Ulm, Germany from German mother and Italian father, grew up in Bologna, Italy and Lugano, Switzerland, studied composition at Giuseppe Verdi Conservatory in Milan with Niccolò Castiglioni and philosophy in Venice with Emanuele Severino; he is founder of the independent music record label Amiata Records; as radio editor he collaborated with Rete 2, a cultural channel of the Swiss Broadcasting Corporation and produced the “Encyclopedia of World Music” in 76 volumes for the Italian RCS Rizzoli Group published by Fabbri; for the group “Espresso – La Repubblica” he produced, among other series, a very popular CD series of “World Music” , a work that for the first time in Italy let music of less known cultures be accessible to a larger audience.

For Amiata Records, Wergo, and other independent record labels he produced more than 130 contemporary and ethnic music CDs in the USA, Germany, France and Italy. With Skeye music, he brought Carla Bruni and her first album “Quel qu’un m’à dit” to Italy just like the “Overhead” music group and other French and English artists. He produced music by artists like Arvo Pärt, Terry Riley, Steve Reich, Sainkho, Ustad Nishat Khan, i Fratelli Mancuso,  Faraualla, Sangeeta Badyopadhnay, Michael Vetter, Hans Otte, Gabin Dabiré, the Club Musical Oriente Cubano, Chögyal Namkhai Norbu, the Monks of the Sera Jé Monastery, The Bauls of Bengal.

He often travelled to Asia, particularly in the Himalayan regions, where he documented and recorded several musical ceremonies of endangered ethnic groups such as the Bön and Gurung, and where he committed himself to the documentation of numerous Tibetan Buddhist ceremonies in exile and of the traditional songs of the nomads of the Kham region (eastern Tibet), of which he published a few CDs. In Italy, together with musicologist Walter Maioli, he has been the creator of the archaeological musical project, Synaulia. He also produced and edited the music of Synaulia for Amiata Records and published “The Music of Ancient Rome” in 2 volumes  (volume I Wind Instruments, volume II String Instruments). Excerpts of this work have been licensed to several major films and TV Series such as [The Gladiator], [The Village], [Rome] and several documentaries produced by the BBC, the Swiss Broadcasting Corporation and RAI.

As composer he published the electronic music albums Solaris (1991) Ad Infinitum (1993) and Omphalos (2001) soundtracks of his sound&light installations. Apart from his producing and editing activities, Matteo Silva is also a visual artist, professor, author of essays, poetry and prose. As musicologist he wrote Music for Peace (1999), Beyond Music (2004), Copyright in digital media (2008). Matteo Silva has been director of the MIM ( Music Industry Management) Program at the European School of Economics in London.
He resides in the countryside, north of Rome, Italy, and in his free time he is a passionate skipper.

Recognitions 

  1998 Deutscher Schallplattenpreis for the album Naked Spirit of Sainkho Namtchylak
  2000 Naird Award as the best independent producer of antique music
  2002 Diapason d'Or for the cd  Bella Maria of Fratelli Mancuso

Bibliography 

Musiche dal mondo – The world music encyclopedia in 76 vol. - RCS/Fratelli Fabbri, Milan, Italy
World Music – 15 vol.  - Gruppo Editoriale L'Espresso/ La Repubblica, Rome, Italy

Discography 
As composer:

 Matteo Silva, Golden Grounds, Odiyana Edition, Lugano 1989
 Matteo Silva, Solaris, Wind Recordings, Bari 1991
 Matteo Silva, Ad Infinitum, Amiata Records, Florence 1993
 Matteo Silva, Omphalos, Amiata Records, Florence 2001

As music producer:

 Adea, Day & Night, Amiata Records, Florence 1996
 Alexandra - Arrigo Cappelletti,    Terras Do Risco, Amiata Records, Florence 2001
 Alon Michael, Israel Edelson,    Meditations of the Heart Vol. I, Amiata Records, Florence 1998
 Amelia Cuni, Werner Durand,    Ashtayama, Amiata Records, Florence 1999
 Andrea Ceccomori & Antonio Rossi,    The Celestine Suite, Amiata Records, Florence 1998
 Andrea Donati,    Ape Regina, Amiata Records, Florence 1997
 Andrea Donati,    Le Ciel De Ma Memoire, Amiata Records, Florence 1995
 Angelo Ricciardi,    Song of Enlightenment, Amiata Records, Florence 1994
 Antonio Breschi,    At the edge of the night, Amiata Records, Florence 1994
 Antonio Breschi,    Toscana, Amiata Records, Florence 1996
 Antonio Infantino,    Tara'ntrance, Amiata Records, Florence 2004
 Antonio Infantino & I Tarantolati,    Tarantella Tarantata, Amiata Records, Florence 1996
 Astor Piazzolla, Thomas Fortmann,    Tango Catolico, Amiata Records, Florance 1994
 Auria Vizia,    New Dawn of the Sacred Flames, Amiata Records, Florence 1997
 Auria Vizia,    Music for The Seven Chakras, Amiata Records, Florence 1996
 Ayub Ogada,    Tanguru', Amiata Records, Rome,  2009
 Chogyal Namkhai N. Rinpoche Chöd, Cutting Through Dualism, Amiata Records, Florence 1992
 Chogyal Namkhai Norbu & Matteo Silva,    Music for the Dance of Vajra, Amiata Records, 2000
 Fabio Forte,    Asia Blue, Amiata Records, Florence 2001
 Faraualla,    Sind', Amiata Records, Florence 2002
 Faraualla,    Faraualla, Amiata Records, Florence 1999
 Flavio Piras,    The Hands, Amiata Records, Florence 1996
 Fratelli Mancuso,    Cantu, Amiata Records, Florence 2002
 Fratelli Mancuso,     Requiem, Amiata Records, Florence 2008
 Fratelli Mancuso & Antonio Marangolo,    Bella Maria, Amiata Records, Florence 1998
 Gabin Dabiré,    Kontomè, Amiata Records, Florence 1996
 Gabin Dabiré,    Afriki Djamana, Amiata Records, Florence 1994
 Gaspare Bernardi,    L'Arco Terrestre, Amiata Records, Florence 2001
 Gianfranco Pernaiachi,    Abendland, Amiata Records, Florence 1996
 Hans Otte,    Aquarian Music, Amiata Records, Florence 1994
 Igor Koshkendey,    Music From Tuva, Amiata Records, Florence 1997
 In a Split Second,    It Happens, Amiata Records, Florence 1997
 Krishna Bhatt Kirwani, Music from India, Amiata Records, Florence 1995
 La Famille Dembelè,    Aira Yo, La Dance Des Jeunes Griots, Amiata Records, Florence 1996
 Marino De Rosas,    Meridies, Amiata Records, Florence 1999
 Mark Kostabi,    Songs for Sumera, Amiata Records, Florence 2002
 Michael Vetter,    Nocturne, Amiata Records, Florence 1993
 Michael Vetter,    Ancient Voices, Amiata Records, Florence 1992
 Neji,    Sat, Amiata Records, Florence 1996
 Nouthong Phimvilayphone,    Visions of the Orient: Music from Laos, Amiata Records, Florence 1995
 Paolo Giaro Ensemble,    Urbino, Amiata Records, Florence 1998
 Paolo Giaro, Krishna Bhatt, D. Gosh,    Dancing In the Light of the Full Moon, Amiata Records, Florence 2006
 Paul Badura-Skoda,    Schubert: The trout In the mirror of time, Amiata Records, Florence 1998
 Quartetto Bernini,    J.S. BACH: L'Arte Della Fuga, Amiata Records, Florence 2001
 Radha,    Radha, Amiata Records, Florence 2001
 Riccardo Fassi,    In The Flow, Amiata Records, Florence 1993
 Roberto Laneri,    Memories of the rain forest, Florence 1993
 Sainkho Namtchylak,    Naked Spirit, Amiata Records, Florence 1998
 Sangeeta Bandyopadhyay/Vincenzo Mingiardi,    Sangita, Amiata Records, Florence 2004
 Savio Riccardi,    La Venere Di Willendorf, Amiata Records, Florence 1999
 S. Reich, A. Part, L. Einaudi, H. Otte, H. M. Gorecki,    New Music Masters, Amiata Records, Florence 1996
 Surabhi Dreams of Sea & Sky, Amiata Records, Florence 1996
 Synaulia,    The Music of Ancient Rome Vol. I, Amiata Records, Florence 1996
 Synaulia,    The Music of Ancient Rome Vol. II, Amiata Records, Florence 2002
 Terry Riley,    The Padova Concert, Amiata Records, Florence 1992
 The Bauls Of Bengal,    A Man of Heart: Music from India, Amiata Records, Florence 1996
 The Saexophones,    From Gesualdo To Sting, Amiata Records, Florence 1996
 Tibetan Monks/Sera Jé Monastery Tibet, Sera Jé, Amiata Records, Florence 1998
 Various Artists,    Cantos a Kiterra, Amiata Records, Florence 1999
 Ustad Nishat Khan,    Meeting Of Angels, Amiata Records, Florence 2003
 Ustad Nishat Khan,    Raga KhanAmiata Records, Florence 2007
 A. Virgilio Savona,    Cose delicate, Amiata Records, Florence 2005
 Whisky Trail,    Chaosmos, Amiata Records, Florence 2006
 Charlette Shulamit Ottolenghi,Italia Ebraica, Amiata Records, Rome 2012
 Diana Garden, La Dolce Vita, Amiata Records, Florence 2003
 Diana Garden,    Tribe, Amiata Records,  Florence 2002
 Various Artists,    African Angels, Amiata Records, Florence 1997
 Various Artists,    Casa Italia, Amiata Records, Florence 2005
 Various Artists,    Celtic Angels, Amiata Records, Florence 1997
 Various Artists,    Colors, Amiata Records, Florence 1998
 Various Artists,    Magnificat - Music for the Jubilee 2000, Amiata Records, Florence 2000
 Various Artists,    Mediterranean Blue, Amiata Records, Florence 2003
 Various Artists,    Morocco - Sounds from the ancient land, Amiata Records, Florence 1998
 Various Artists,    Premio Città Di Recanati Vol.I, Amiata Records, Florence 2001
 Various Artists,    Premio Città Di Recanati Vol.II, Amiata Records, Florence 2002
 Various Artists,    Sacred Planet, Amiata Records, Florence 1998
 Various Artists,    Viva Cuba Libre, Amiata Records, Florence 2000
 Various Artists,    Voices of Africa, Amiata Records, Amiata Records, Florence 1997
 Various Artists,    Winds & Strings of Africa, Amiata Records, Florence 1997
 Various Artists,    Drums of Africa, Amiata Records, Florence 1997

Notes

External links 
 Synaulia
 Amiata Records
 Sangita Badhyopadhnay
 Fratelli Fabbri Editore

Italian record producers
Swiss publishers (people)
Italian male writers
1960 births
Living people